Alex Chu (born  Chu Hun-gon September 2, 1979), known simply as Alex, is a Korean-Canadian singer and actor. He is the male vocalist of the South Korean electropop band Clazziquai.

Biography
Having immigrated to Canada with his family, Alex rose to fame upon returning to South Korea years later as part of the group Clazziquai. The group's popularity skyrocketed after featuring on the soundtrack of hit drama series My Lovely Samsoon.

In 2008, the group announced a temporary hiatus, and its members debuted as solo artists, including Alex.  In 2009, Clazziquai returned with the release of Mucho Punk.

Alex Chu became part of the MBC reality show We Got Married  and was matched with Korean trot singer Jang Yoon-jeong in the Lunar Special episode, and actress/model Shin Ae for the rest of the series. The show also stars Crown J, Andy of Shinhwa, Seo In-young of Jewelry, Solbi of Typhoon, Saori and Jung Hyung-don. Alex and Shin Ae left the show after Episode 8 for Alex to record his first solo album Vintage Romance. They were replaced by Kim Hyun-joong of SS501 and Hwangbo of Chakra. However, due to popular demand, the couple reunited in Episode 13. Alex and Shin Ae made their exit from the show on November 16, 2008.

Alex debuted in his first drama series Pasta as one of the main cast. The drama aired from January 4, 2010 to March 9, 2010 on MBC.

On June 2, 2011, Alex released his second solo album, Just Like Me.

On June 1, 2012, Alex opened a new Italian restaurant, D'asti Plate, in January 2018 known as D'Asti NY.  He partnered with three of his close friends to open the restaurant, which is located in the Shinsadong area of Seoul.

In 2013, he appeared in the KBS variety show Our Neighborhood Arts and Physical Education to participate during the bowling matches from episode 6 to episode 9.

In 2016, Alex started hosting a variety show My Neighbor, Charles.

Personal life

Alex Chu was booked without detention by Gangnam Police in Seoul for driving while intoxicated in Seoul on July 18, 2012. Chu had blood alcohol content of 0.134%.

Discography

Studio albums

Singles

Collaborations

Soundtrack appearances

Television shows

TV drama

Variety show

References

External links 
 

1979 births
Living people
Korean-language singers of Canada
K-pop singers
Male actors from Vancouver
Musicians from Vancouver
South Korean male singers
South Korean pop singers
South Korean pop pianists
South Korean electronic musicians
South Korean jazz singers
South Korean male television actors
South Korean television presenters
South Korean radio presenters
Canadian musicians of Korean descent
21st-century South Korean singers
Jeonju Chu clan
Male pianists
21st-century pianists
21st-century Canadian male singers
Canadian male jazz musicians
Clazziquai Project members